Weissensee is a German television series. The series is set in East Berlin between 1980 and 1990 and follows two families.

Outline
The plot follows the Kupfer family, who are well-connected within the communist regime. Hans Kupfer and his son Falk are both senior officers within the East German secret police, whilst his younger son Martin is a regular policeman in the Volkspolizei. Martin opted for this job due to concerns with the morals of the regime. After a brief car chase one evening, Martin arrests Julia Hausmann, a young shop worker. After her release, they quickly strike up a relationship. However, the situation is complicated by the fact that Julia's mother is a singer known for frequently criticising the regime, and the Kupfers' resultant hostility. Falk works to try divide the couple, whilst Hans secretly approaches Julia's mother, with whom it transpires that he once had an affair.

Cast
 Uwe Kockisch as Hans Kupfer
 Jörg Hartmann as Falk Kupfer
 Florian Lukas as Martin Kupfer
 Anna Loos as Vera Kupfer
 Ruth Reinecke as Marlene Kupfer
 Katrin Sass as Dunja Hausmann
 Hannah Herzsprung as Julia Hausmann

See also
 List of German television series

Further reading
Evans, Alex (2013) 'Germany can't produce a Breaking Bad', at thelocal.de, 15 October 2013

External links
  
 

Films set in Berlin
2010 German television series debuts
Television series set in the 1980s
German-language television shows
Das Erste original programming
Grimme-Preis for fiction winners